Black Angus Steakhouse, also known before 2005 as Stuart Anderson's Black Angus, is an American restaurant chain that specializes in steaks, headquartered in Sherman Oaks, California. The chain was founded on April 3, 1964, by Stuart Anderson of Seattle, Washington.

History
Stuart Anderson founded the Black Angus Steakhouse chain in 1964. 

Saga acquired Black Angus in 1972. Marriott acquired Saga in 1987, and sold several of the Saga restaurants to American Restaurant Group.

In 1995, the chain had 101 restaurants and reported revenue of $244 million. In 1999, the overall parent company's profits were steady at $104.7 million, but higher for the Black Angus chain.

By 2001, there were 103 Black Angus restaurants in 13 states, and each restaurant had approximately 75 employees and served an average of 3,000 customers weekly. By 2004, the number had fallen to 93 Black Angus and Cattle Company restaurants in 10 states, with 57 units in California.

In September 2004, American Restaurant Group filed for Chapter 11 bankruptcy protection for Black Angus Steakhouse. Black Angus was indebted approximately $202 million and had in 2003 reported revenue of $276.6 million resulting in a net loss of $32.5 million. The bankruptcy proceeded concurrently with an effort to re-brand and remodel the chain.

On January 15, 2009, American Restaurant Group itself filed for Chapter 11 bankruptcy protection. Black Angus Steakhouse was purchased by Versa Capital Management Inc. in March 2009.

On June 6, 2016, Stuart Anderson died of lung cancer at age 93 at his home in Rancho Mirage, California.

As of November 2021, there are 32 Black Angus locations across Arizona, California, Hawaii, New Mexico and Washington.

In popular culture
In the late 1990s and early 2000s, Black Angus had a television ad campaign featuring "Travis", a grizzled cowboy encouraging numerous urbanites to dine at the restaurant. Comedian Patton Oswalt poked fun at the ads' apparent aggressiveness in a well-known humorous riff included on his 2003 album Feelin' Kinda Patton.

In The Simpsons episode "Lisa the Skeptic", Bart asks if they are dressing up to go to Black Angus.

In Dawson's Creek episode "Home Movies", Pacey asks if the Dalai Lama has been spotted at Black Angus.

References

External links 
 
 Prime Club
 Bloomberg Profile for Black Angus

Restaurant chains in the United States
Steakhouses in the United States
Restaurants in California
Food and drink companies based in Los Angeles
Los Altos, California
Restaurants established in 1964
1964 establishments in California
Privately held companies based in California
Companies that filed for Chapter 11 bankruptcy in 2004
Companies that filed for Chapter 11 bankruptcy in 2009